The Paris Musketeers are an American football team in Paris, France, that plays in the European League of Football (ELF) in the Western Conference.

History 
The long awaited Paris franchise was announced on 23 September 2022 via a press statement, together with the Prague Lions for the 2023 European League of Football expansion. The team is owned and operated by the capital group named Les Mousquetaires de Paris and is based in Rosny-sous-Bois, eastern of Paris. General manager is former NFL-Player Marc-Angelo Soumah and Frantzy Dorlean is the inaugural president of the franchise. Further stakeholders are Patrick Butler, CFL Grey Cup winner Jason Johnson and John McKeon, all operating as directors.
The team name Saints, logo and colors of the franchise were unveiled on 23 January 2023. In the meantime, they were known as Paris Football Team. On the 27 Februar 2023, the organization announced, that they have changed their official name into Musketeers.

First head coach of the franchise will be former Vanderbilt Commodores' defensive secondary coach Marc Mattioli.

The first ever recruitment camp of the team was organized on 20 November 2022 with around 240 French and international players in attendance. Shortly after the first players were announced with French nationals Mamadou Sy and Mamadou Doumbouya, both having their origins from the national league champion La Courneuve Flash. Further building blocks of the roster consists of the first ever franchise quarterback Zach Edwards, coming from the Barcelona Dragons.

Stadium
The Musketeers held their tryout at the Paris La Défense Arena with a capacity of 30,680 seats. On 13 March 2023, the franchise announced the Stade Jean Bouin in the 16th arrondissement of Paris as their home field for the 2023 season.

Roster

Staff

Head coaches

References

Paris Musketeers
European League of Football teams
American football teams in France
Sports clubs in Paris
American football teams established in 2022
2022 establishments in France